"Stars on 45" is a song medley issued in January 1981 by Dutch studio group Stars on 45. In some countries, including the UK, Ireland, and New Zealand, the band was credited as 'Starsound' and only the medley itself was named "Stars on 45".

Its official title in the US and Canada (as on the record and in Billboard and RPM) is "Medley: Intro 'Venus' / Sugar Sugar / No Reply / I'll Be Back / Drive My Car / Do You Want to Know a Secret / We Can Work It Out / I Should Have Known Better / Nowhere Man / You're Going to Lose That Girl / Stars on 45" and was credited to 'Stars on 45'. It is (to date) the longest titled song to ever chart in Billboard and was conveniently shortened to "Stars on 45 Medley", or "'Medley' by Stars on 45". The length of the name surpassed the previous record set by Ray Stevens's "Jeremiah Peabody's Polyunsaturated Quick-Dissolving Fast-Acting Pleasant-Tasting Green and Purple Pills", and (among songs that reached number one), "(Hey Won't You Play) Another Somebody Done Somebody Wrong Song"  by B. J. Thomas.  The reason for the long title was copyright requirements for the use of The Beatles' songs.

It reached number 1 in the Netherlands on February 21, 1981; number 2 in the UK on May 9, 1981; and number 1 on the Billboard Hot 100 on June 20, 1981. In the US, the single also peaked at number 18 on the dance chart. In the US, the song's one-week stay at the top of the Hot 100 interrupted Bette Davis Eyes's run as the number 1 single at five weeks. The next week, the Kim Carnes song regained its number 1 status for an additional four weeks.

The origin of the single was the Netherlands where numerous bootleg disco singles were floating around. Willem van Kooten, the owner of one of the copyrights, decided to make a similar, legitimate record of a 12" single titled "Let's Do It in the 80s Great Hits" credited to a Canadian group called Passion (though the snippets of songs were taken from the original recordings). He found singers who sounded similar to John Lennon and Paul McCartney and decided to make the single focus on The Beatles. The Beatles medley was later extended to a full 16-minute album side. It appeared on the Stars on 45's first full-length release, Long Play Album (US title: Stars on Long Play; UK title: Stars on 45 - The Album).

The album version of the song moved "Venus" and "Sugar Sugar" to Side Two into a different medley, and added several more Beatles songs as well as a 32-second instrumental extract from George Harrison's "My Sweet Lord" and even a fleeting reference to new wave band Sparks's "Beat the Clock", for a total length of about 15 minutes. The album version was released as Long Play Album in the Netherlands, and retitled Stars on Long Play in the US and Stars on 45 — The Album in the UK. A detailed listing of the source material can be found in the Long Play Album article.

The song also became a huge success in the UK where it kicked off a craze for medleys, with a large number of records in the Stars on 45 mould reaching the UK Top 40 in 1981. For example, The Hollies recorded "Holliedaze", a medley of some of their previous hits, which reached 28 on the UK charts with Graham Nash and Eric Haydock briefly rejoining the group in September 1981 to promote the record. Likewise, in the US the song started a medley craze that lasted for about a year and introduced not only other medleys by Stars on 45, but medleys by the Beatles themselves, The Beach Boys, the Royal Philharmonic Orchestra, and Larry Elgart and His Manhattan Swing Orchestra.

Track listing

7" single
Side one
"Stars on 45" (Medley - 7" Mix) - 4:48 (US: - 4:05)
"Stars on 45" (Eggermont, Duiser - omitted on the US version)
"Venus" (Van Leeuwen)
"Sugar, Sugar" (Kim, Barry)
"No Reply" (Lennon, McCartney)
"I'll Be Back" (Lennon, McCartney)
"Drive My Car" (Lennon, McCartney)
"Do You Want to Know a Secret" (Lennon, McCartney)
"We Can Work It Out" (Lennon, McCartney)
"I Should Have Known Better" (Lennon, McCartney)
"Nowhere Man" (Lennon, McCartney)
"You're Going to Lose That Girl" (Lennon, McCartney)
"Stars on 45" (Eggermont, Duiser)
 Includes uncredited musical references to Sparks's song "Beat the Clock"

Side two
"Stars on 45" (Theme - 7" Mix) (Eggermont, Duiser) - 3:30
 Includes uncredited musical references to Lipps Inc.'s "Funkytown" and The Buggles' "Video Killed the Radio Star"

"Venus" is the 1970 Shocking Blue song, written by the band's Robbie van Leeuwen and later covered by Tom Jones and Bananarama. Only the opening guitar riff is used in the medley. "Sugar, Sugar" was originally recorded by The Archies (written by Jeff Barry and Andy Kim). The next eight songs are Beatles songs (written by John Lennon and Paul McCartney).

An extended version of the "Stars on 45" intro and finale was put on the flip side of the single.

12" single
Side one
"Stars on 45" 11:30 (US: 10:15)
"Stars on 45" (Eggermont, Duiser)
"Funkytown" (Greenberg)
"Boogie Nights" (Temperton)
"Video Killed the Radio Star" (Horn, Downes, Wooley)
"Venus" (van Leeuwen)
"Sugar, Sugar" (Kim, Barry)
"No Reply" (Lennon, McCartney)
"I'll Be Back" (Lennon, McCartney)
"Drive My Car" (Lennon, McCartney)
"Do You Want to Know a Secret" (Lennon, McCartney)
"We Can Work It Out" (Lennon, McCartney)
"I Should Have Known Better" (Lennon, McCartney)
"Nowhere Man" (Lennon, McCartney)
"You're Going to Lose That Girl" (Lennon, McCartney)
"Sherry Baby" (Shye & Gizmo)
"Cathy's Clown" (Everly, Everly)
"Breaking Up Is Hard to Do" (Sedaka, Greenfield)
"Only the Lonely" (Orbison, Melson)
"Lady Bump" (Levay, Kunze)
"Jimmy Mack" (Holland, Dozier, Holland)
"Here Comes That Rainy Day Feeling Again" (Cook, Greenaway, Instone)
"Itsy Bitsy Teenie Weenie Yellow Polka Dot Bikini" (Vance, Pockriss)
"Stars on 45" (Eggermont, Duiser)
 Includes uncredited musical references to Sparks's "Beat the Clock", Ritz's "I Wanna Get With You", The S.O.S. Band's "Take Your Time (Do It Right)", and Sparkle Tuhran & Friends’ “Handsome Man”

Side two
"Stars on 45" (Theme - 12" Mix) (Eggermont, Duiser) - 6:18
 Includes uncredited musical references to Lipps Inc.'s "Funkytown" and The Buggles' "Video Killed the Radio Star"

"Stars on 45 Medley 2"
The success of the single in North America even resulted in Radio Records rush-releasing a second single for the US market. The last four minutes of the album version of the Beatles medley ("Good Day Sunshine"/"My Sweet Lord"/"Here Comes the Sun"/"While My Guitar Gently Weeps"/"Taxman"/"A Hard Day's Night"/"Things We Said Today"/"If I Fell"/"You Can't Do That"/"Please Please Me"/"I Want to Hold Your Hand"/"Stars on 45") was released under the title "Stars on 45 Medley 2" but peaked at No. 67 on the Billboard Hot 100. The second Beatles medley single was not released in the Netherlands or any other part of the world.

1989 remix
The Beatles medley was remixed and re-released in a house music version in Europe in 1989 under the title "Stars on '89 Remix", then featuring an alternate selection of Beatles tracks taken from the album version of the medley, coupled with a new "Stars on 45" theme called "Rock the House". The single was remixed and reproduced by Danny van Passel and Rutti Kroese and released on the Red Bullet label as a 7", 12", and CD single, all formats backed with an extended version of the "Rock the House" theme.

Track listings
Radio version - 4:01
"Rock the House" (van Passel, van Passel, Kroese)
"Stars on 45" (Eggermont, Duiser)
"Rock the House" (van Passel, van Passel, Kroese)
"A Hard Day's Night" (Lennon, McCartney)
"Nowhere Man" (Lennon, McCartney)
"You're Going to Lose That Girl" (Lennon, McCartney)
"No Reply" (Lennon, McCartney)
"Rock the House" (van Passel, van Passel, Kroese)
"Taxman" (Harrison)
"Ticket to Ride" (Lennon, McCartney)
"Drive My Car" (Lennon, McCartney)
"Do You Want to Know a Secret" (Lennon, McCartney)
"Rock the House" (van Passel, van Passel, Kroese)
"We Can Work It Out" (Lennon, McCartney)
"I Should Have Known Better" (Lennon, McCartney)
"Rock the House" (van Passel, van Passel, Kroese)

Extended version - 6:17
"Rock the House" (van Passel, van Passel, Kroese)
"Stars on 45" (Eggermont, Duiser)
"Rock the House" (van Passel, van Passel, Kroese)
"A Hard Day's Night" (Lennon, McCartney)
"Please Please Me" (Lennon, McCartney)
"From Me to You" (Lennon, McCartney)
"Ticket to Ride" (Lennon, McCartney)
"Drive My Car" (Lennon, McCartney)
"Do You Want to Know a Secret" (Lennon, McCartney)
"We Can Work It Out" (Lennon, McCartney)
"I Should Have Known Better" (Lennon, McCartney)
"Rock the House" (van Passel, van Passel, Kroese)
"Nowhere Man" (Lennon, McCartney)
"You're Going to Lose That Girl" (Lennon, McCartney)
"No Reply" (Lennon, McCartney)
"Rock the House" (van Passel, van Passel, Kroese)
"Taxman" (Harrison)
"Rock the House" (van Passel, van Passel, Kroese)
"I Want to Hold Your Hand" (Lennon, McCartney)
"Rock the House" (van Passel, van Passel, Kroese)

Charts

Weekly charts

Year-end charts

Certifications

Other versions
 In 2006, the Global Deejays released an updated version of "Stars on 45", but the medleys were not included.
 In 2011, "Stars on 45" was given the house treatment, with the single released as "45". This version also leaves out the medleys.

Parodies
A parody of "Stars on 45," entitled "Stars Over 45," was done by Chas & Dave. It was a hit in the UK, where it reached No. 21 in early 1982.

"Maoris on 45" (1982), a song inspired by the "Stars on 45" concept but instead featuring popular traditional Māori music set to guitar, was a hit in New Zealand.

"Weird Al" Yankovic has regularly included polka medleys of popular hits on most of his albums. The tradition began as a parody of "Stars on 45" (billed as "Polkas on 45") on Yankovic's second album "Weird Al" Yankovic in 3-D.

See also
List of Billboard Hot 100 number-one singles of 1981
Barbra Streisand (song), 2010, with similar vocal part

References

Bibliography
Bronson, Fred.  The Billboard Book of Number One Hits.  New York.  Billboard Books, 2003.

Sources and external links
 
 
 Rateyourmusic.com biography and discography
 

1981 debut singles
Stars on 45 songs
CNR Music singles
CBS Records singles
Atlantic Records singles
Number-one singles in Australia
Number-one singles in Austria
European Hot 100 Singles number-one singles
Number-one singles in Germany
Irish Singles Chart number-one singles
Dutch Top 40 number-one singles
Number-one singles in New Zealand
RPM Top Singles number-one singles
Number-one singles in Switzerland
Billboard Hot 100 number-one singles
Cashbox number-one singles
Songs about the Beatles
Songs written by Lennon–McCartney
Songs written by Robbie van Leeuwen
Songs written by Jeff Barry
Music medleys
1980s fads and trends